In mathematics, a stereographic projection is a perspective projection of the sphere, through a specific point on the sphere (the pole or center of projection), onto a plane (the projection plane) perpendicular to the diameter through the point. It is a smooth, bijective function from the entire sphere except the center of projection to the entire plane. It maps circles on the sphere to circles or lines on the plane, and is conformal, meaning that it preserves angles at which curves meet and thus locally approximately preserves shapes. It is neither isometric (distance preserving) nor equiareal (area preserving).

The stereographic projection gives a way to represent a sphere by a plane. The metric induced by the inverse stereographic projection from the plane to the sphere defines a geodesic distance between points in the plane equal to the spherical distance between the spherical points they represent. A two-dimensional coordinate system on the stereographic plane is an alternative setting for spherical analytic geometry instead of spherical polar coordinates or three-dimensional cartesian coordinates. This is the spherical analog of the Poincaré disk model of the hyperbolic plane.

Intuitively, the stereographic projection is a way of picturing the sphere as the plane, with some inevitable compromises. Because the sphere and the plane appear in many areas of mathematics and its applications, so does the stereographic projection; it finds use in diverse fields including complex analysis, cartography, geology, and photography. Sometimes stereographic computations are done graphically using a special kind of graph paper called a stereographic net, shortened to stereonet, or Wulff net.

History

The stereographic projection was known to Hipparchus, Ptolemy and probably earlier to the Egyptians. It was originally known as the planisphere projection. Planisphaerium by Ptolemy is the oldest surviving document that describes it. One of its most important uses was the representation of celestial charts. The term planisphere is still used to refer to such charts.

In the 16th and 17th century, the equatorial aspect of the stereographic projection was commonly used for maps of the Eastern and Western Hemispheres. It is believed that already the map created in 1507 by Gualterius Lud was in stereographic projection, as were later the maps of Jean Roze (1542), Rumold Mercator (1595), and many others. In star charts, even this equatorial aspect had been utilised already by the ancient astronomers like Ptolemy.

François d'Aguilon gave the stereographic projection its current name in his 1613 work Opticorum libri sex philosophis juxta ac mathematicis utiles (Six Books of Optics, useful for philosophers and mathematicians alike).

In the late 16th century, Thomas Harriot proved that the stereographic projection is conformal; however, this proof was never published and sat among his papers in a box for more than three centuries. In 1695, Edmond Halley, motivated by his interest in star charts, was the first to publish a proof. He used the recently established tools of calculus, invented by his friend Isaac Newton.

Definition

First formulation

The unit sphere  in three-dimensional space  is the set of points  such that . Let  be the "north pole", and let  be the rest of the sphere. The plane  runs through the center of the sphere; the "equator" is the intersection of the sphere with this plane.

In spherical coordinates  on the sphere (with  the zenith angle, and  the azimuth) and polar coordinates  on the plane, the projection and its inverse are

Here,  is understood to have value  when  = 0. Also, there are many ways to rewrite these formulas using trigonometric identities. In cylindrical coordinates  on the sphere and polar coordinates  on the plane, the projection and its inverse are

Other conventions

Some authors define stereographic projection from the north pole (0, 0, 1) onto the plane , which is tangent to the unit sphere at the south pole (0, 0, −1). The values  and  produced by this projection are exactly twice those produced by the equatorial projection described in the preceding section. For example, this projection sends the equator to the circle of radius 2 centered at the origin. While the equatorial projection produces no infinitesimal area distortion along the equator, this pole-tangent projection instead produces no infinitesimal area distortion at the south pole.

Other authors use a sphere of radius  and the plane . In this case the formulae become

In general, one can define a stereographic projection from any point  on the sphere onto any plane  such that
 is perpendicular to the diameter through , and
 does not contain .
As long as  meets these conditions, then for any point  other than  the line through  and  meets  in exactly one point , which is defined to be the stereographic projection of P onto E.

Generalizations
More generally, stereographic projection may be applied to the unit -sphere  in -dimensional Euclidean space .

Defining

the inverse is given by

Still more generally, suppose that  is a (nonsingular) quadric hypersurface in the projective space . In other words,  is the locus of zeros of a non-singular quadratic form  in the homogeneous coordinates . As before, the stereographic projection is conformal and invertible outside of a "small" set. The stereographic projection presents the quadric hypersurface as a rational hypersurface. This construction plays a role in algebraic geometry and conformal geometry.

Properties
The first stereographic projection defined in the preceding section sends the "south pole" (0, 0, −1) of the unit sphere to (0, 0), the equator to the unit circle, the southern hemisphere to the region inside the circle, and the northern hemisphere to the region outside the circle.

The projection is not defined at the projection point  = (0, 0, 1). Small neighborhoods of this point are sent to subsets of the plane far away from (0, 0). The closer  is to (0, 0, 1), the more distant its image is from (0, 0) in the plane. For this reason it is common to speak of (0, 0, 1) as mapping to "infinity" in the plane, and of the sphere as completing the plane by adding a point at infinity. This notion finds utility in projective geometry and complex analysis. On a merely topological level, it illustrates how the sphere is homeomorphic to the one-point compactification of the plane.

In Cartesian coordinates a point  on the sphere and its image  on the plane either both are rational points or none of them:
 

Stereographic projection is conformal, meaning that it preserves the angles at which curves cross each other (see figures). On the other hand, stereographic projection does not preserve area; in general, the area of a region of the sphere does not equal the area of its projection onto the plane. The area element is given in  coordinates by

Along the unit circle, where , there is no inflation of area in the limit, giving a scale factor of 1. Near (0, 0) areas are inflated by a factor of 4, and near infinity areas are inflated by arbitrarily small factors.

The metric is given in  coordinates by

and is the unique formula found in Bernhard Riemann's Habilitationsschrift on the foundations of geometry, delivered at Göttingen in 1854, and entitled Über die Hypothesen welche der Geometrie zu Grunde liegen.

No map from the sphere to the plane can be both conformal and area-preserving. If it were, then it would be a local isometry and would preserve Gaussian curvature. The sphere and the plane have different Gaussian curvatures, so this is impossible.

Circles on the sphere that do not pass through the point of projection are projected to circles on the plane. Circles on the sphere that do pass through the point of projection are projected to straight lines on the plane. These lines are sometimes thought of as circles through the point at infinity, or circles of infinite radius. The equation becomes linear if  that is, if the plane passes through the point of projection.

All lines in the plane, when transformed to circles on the sphere by the inverse of stereographic projection, meet at the projection point. Parallel lines, which do not intersect in the plane, are transformed to circles tangent at projection point. Intersecting lines are transformed to circles that intersect transversally at two points in the sphere, one of which is the projection point. (Similar remarks hold about the real projective plane, but the intersection relationships are different there.)

The loxodromes of the sphere map to curves on the plane of the form

where the parameter  measures the "tightness" of the loxodrome. Thus loxodromes correspond to logarithmic spirals. These spirals intersect radial lines in the plane at equal angles, just as the loxodromes intersect meridians on the sphere at equal angles. 

The stereographic projection relates to the plane inversion in a simple way.

In other words, if:
  is a point on the sphere, but not a 'north pole'  and not its antipode, the 'south pole' ,

Wulff net

Stereographic projection plots can be carried out by a computer using the explicit formulas given above. However, for graphing by hand these formulas are unwieldy. Instead, it is common to use graph paper designed specifically for the task. This special graph paper is called a stereonet or Wulff net, after the Russian mineralogist George (Yuri Viktorovich) Wulff.

The Wulff net shown here is the stereographic projection of the grid of parallels and meridians of a hemisphere centred at a point on the equator (such as the Eastern or Western hemisphere of a planet).

In the figure, the area-distorting property of the stereographic projection can be seen by comparing a grid sector near the center of the net with one at the far right or left. The two sectors have equal areas on the sphere. On the disk, the latter has nearly four times the area of the former. If the grid is made finer, this ratio approaches exactly 4.

On the Wulff net, the images of the parallels and meridians intersect at right angles. This orthogonality property is a consequence of the angle-preserving property of the stereographic projection. (However, the angle-preserving property is stronger than this property. Not all projections that preserve the orthogonality of parallels and meridians are angle-preserving.)

For an example of the use of the Wulff net, imagine two copies of it on thin paper, one atop the other, aligned and tacked at their mutual center. Let  be the point on the lower unit hemisphere whose spherical coordinates are (140°, 60°) and whose Cartesian coordinates are (0.321, 0.557, −0.766). This point lies on a line oriented 60° counterclockwise from the positive -axis (or 30° clockwise from the positive -axis) and 50° below the horizontal plane . Once these angles are known, there are four steps to plotting :
Using the grid lines, which are spaced 10° apart in the figures here, mark the point on the edge of the net that is 60° counterclockwise from the point (1, 0) (or 30° clockwise from the point (0, 1)).
Rotate the top net until this point is aligned with (1, 0) on the bottom net.
Using the grid lines on the bottom net, mark the point that is 50° toward the center from that point.
Rotate the top net oppositely to how it was oriented before, to bring it back into alignment with the bottom net. The point marked in step 3 is then the projection that we wanted.
To plot other points, whose angles are not such round numbers as 60° and 50°, one must visually interpolate between the nearest grid lines. It is helpful to have a net with finer spacing than 10°. Spacings of 2° are common.

To find the central angle between two points on the sphere based on their stereographic plot, overlay the plot on a Wulff net and rotate the plot about the center until the two points lie on or near a meridian. Then measure the angle between them by counting grid lines along that meridian.

Applications within mathematics

Complex analysis

Although any stereographic projection misses one point on the sphere (the projection point), the entire sphere can be mapped using two projections from distinct projection points. In other words, the sphere can be covered by two stereographic parametrizations (the inverses of the projections) from the plane. The parametrizations can be chosen to induce the same orientation on the sphere. Together, they describe the sphere as an oriented surface (or two-dimensional manifold).

This construction has special significance in complex analysis. The point  in the real plane can be identified with the complex number . The stereographic projection from the north pole onto the equatorial plane is then

Similarly, letting  be another complex coordinate, the functions

define a stereographic projection from the south pole onto the equatorial plane. This facilitates an elegant and useful notion of infinity for the complex numbers and indeed an entire theory of meromorphic functions mapping to the Riemann sphere. The standard metric on the unit sphere agrees with the Fubini–Study metric on the Riemann sphere.

Visualization of lines and planes

The set of all lines through the origin in three-dimensional space forms a space called the real projective plane. This plane is difficult to visualize, because it cannot be embedded in three-dimensional space.

However, one can visualize it as a disk, as follows. Any line through the origin intersects the southern hemisphere  ≤ 0 in a point, which can then be stereographically projected to a point on a disk in the XY plane. Horizontal lines through the origin intersect the southern hemisphere in two antipodal points along the equator, which project to the boundary of the disk. Either of the two projected points can be considered part of the disk; it is understood that antipodal points on the equator represent a single line in 3 space and a single point on the boundary of the projected disk (see quotient topology). So any set of lines through the origin can be pictured as a set of points in the projected disk.  But the boundary points behave differently from the boundary points of an ordinary 2-dimensional disk, in that any one of them is simultaneously close to interior points on opposite sides of the disk (just as two nearly horizontal lines through the origin can project to points on opposite sides of the disk).

Also, every plane through the origin intersects the unit sphere in a great circle, called the trace of the plane. This circle maps to a circle under stereographic projection. So the projection lets us visualize planes as circular arcs in the disk.  Prior to the availability of computers, stereographic projections with great circles often involved drawing large-radius arcs that required use of a beam compass.  Computers now make this task much easier.

Further associated with each plane is a unique line, called the plane's pole, that passes through the origin and is perpendicular to the plane. This line can be plotted as a point on the disk just as any line through the origin can. So the stereographic projection also lets us visualize planes as points in the disk. For plots involving many planes, plotting their poles produces a less-cluttered picture than plotting their traces.

This construction is used to visualize directional data in crystallography and geology, as described below.

Other visualization
Stereographic projection is also applied to the visualization of polytopes.

Arithmetic geometry

In elementary arithmetic geometry, stereographic projection from the unit circle provides a means to describe all primitive Pythagorean triples.  Specifically, stereographic projection from the north pole (0,1) onto the -axis gives a one-to-one correspondence between the rational number points  on the unit circle (with ) and the rational points of the -axis.  If  is a rational point on the -axis, then its inverse stereographic projection is the point

which gives Euclid's formula for a Pythagorean triple.

Tangent half-angle substitution

The pair of trigonometric functions  can be thought of as parametrizing the unit circle.  The stereographic projection gives an alternative parametrization of the unit circle:

Under this reparametrization, the length element  of the unit circle goes over to

This substitution can sometimes simplify integrals involving trigonometric functions.

Applications to other disciplines

Cartography

The fundamental problem of cartography is that no map from the sphere to the plane can accurately represent both angles and areas. In general, area-preserving map projections are preferred for statistical applications, while angle-preserving (conformal) map projections are preferred for navigation.

Stereographic projection falls into the second category. When the projection is centered at the Earth's north or south pole, it has additional desirable properties: It sends meridians to rays emanating from the origin and parallels to circles centered at the origin.

Planetary science

The stereographic is the only projection that maps all circles on a sphere to circles on a plane. This property is valuable in planetary mapping where craters are typical features. The set of circles passing through the point of projection have unbounded radius, and therefore degenerate into lines.

Crystallography

In crystallography, the orientations of crystal axes and faces in three-dimensional space are a central geometric concern, for example in the interpretation of X-ray and electron diffraction patterns. These orientations can be visualized as in the section Visualization of lines and planes above. That is, crystal axes and poles to crystal planes are intersected with the northern hemisphere and then plotted using stereographic projection. A plot of poles is called a pole figure.

In electron diffraction, Kikuchi line pairs appear as bands decorating the intersection between lattice plane traces and the Ewald sphere thus providing experimental access to a crystal's stereographic projection.  Model Kikuchi maps in reciprocal space, and fringe visibility maps for use with bend contours in direct space, thus act as road maps for exploring orientation space with crystals in the transmission electron microscope.

Geology

Researchers in structural geology are concerned with the orientations of planes and lines for a number of reasons. The foliation of a rock is a planar feature that often contains a linear feature called lineation. Similarly, a fault plane is a planar feature that may contain linear features such as slickensides.

These orientations of lines and planes at various scales can be plotted using the methods of the Visualization of lines and planes section above. As in crystallography, planes are typically plotted by their poles. Unlike crystallography, the southern hemisphere is used instead of the northern one (because the geological features in question lie below the Earth's surface). In this context the stereographic projection is often referred to as the equal-angle lower-hemisphere projection. The equal-area lower-hemisphere projection defined by the Lambert azimuthal equal-area projection is also used, especially when the plot is to be subjected to subsequent statistical analysis such as density contouring.

Photography

Some fisheye lenses use a stereographic projection to capture a wide-angle view. Compared to more traditional fisheye lenses which use an equal-area projection, areas close to the edge retain their shape, and straight lines are less curved. However, stereographic fisheye lenses are typically more expensive to manufacture.  Image remapping software, such as Panotools, allows the automatic remapping of photos from an equal-area fisheye to a stereographic projection.

The stereographic projection has been used to map spherical panoramas, starting with Horace Bénédict de Saussure's in 1779. This results in effects known as a little planet (when the center of projection is the nadir) and a tube (when the center of projection is the zenith).

The popularity of using stereographic projections to map panoramas over other azimuthal projections is attributed to the shape preservation that results from the conformality of the projection.

See also
List of map projections
Astrolabe
Astronomical clock
Poincaré disk model, the analogous mapping of the hyperbolic plane
Stereographic projection in cartography

References

Sources

External links

Stereographic Projection  on PlanetMath
Stereographic Projection and Inversion from Cut-the-Knot
DoITPoMS Teaching and Learning Package - "The Stereographic Projection"

Videos 
Proof about Stereographic Projection taking circles in the sphere to circles in the plane

Software 
 Stereonet, a software tool for structural geology by Rick Allmendinger.
 PTCLab, the phase transformation crystallography lab
 Sphaerica, software tool for straightedge and compass construction on the sphere, including a stereographic projection display option
 Three dimensional Java Applet

Miniplanet panoramas 
Examples of miniplanet panoramas, majority in UK
Examples of miniplanet panoramas, majority in Czech Republic
Examples of miniplanet panoramas, majority in Poland

Map projections
Conformal mappings
Conformal projections
Crystallography
Projective geometry